Cara Paraná River is a river of Colombia. It is part of the Amazon River basin and is a tributary of the Putumayo River.

See also
List of rivers of Colombia

References
Rand McNally, The New International Atlas, 1993.
 

Rivers of Colombia